Snow Bowl or Snowbowl may refer to:

Sporting events
A nickname for various gridiron football games played during snowy conditions:
Canadian Football League (CFL)
 84th Grey Cup (1996), between the Toronto Argonauts and Edmonton Eskimos played in Hamilton, Ontario
 105th Grey Cup (2017), between the Toronto Argonauts and Calgary Stampeders played in Ottawa, Ontario

College football (NCAA)
 Snow Bowl (1950), match-up of the Michigan Wolverines at Ohio State Buckeyes
 Snow Bowl, 1992 match-up of the Penn State Nittany Lions at Notre Dame Fighting Irish (recap)
 2000 Independence Bowl, between the Mississippi State Bulldogs and Texas A&M Aggies played in Shreveport, Louisiana

National Football League (NFL)
 1948 NFL Championship Game, between the Chicago Cardinals at Philadelphia Eagles, also known as the [“Philly Blizzard”]
 Snow Bowl (1985), week 13 match-up of the Tampa Bay Buccaneers at Green Bay Packers
 Snow Bowl, 2001 AFC Divisional Playoff match-up of the Oakland Raiders at New England Patriots, also known as the Tuck Rule Game
 Snow Bowl, 2007 NFC Divisional Playoff match-up of the Seattle Seahawks at Green Bay Packers, also known as the [“Snow Globe Game”]
 Snow Bowl, 2013 week 14 match-up of the Detroit Lions at Philadelphia Eagles, also known as the [“Blizzard Bowl”]
 Snow Bowl (2017), week 14 match-up of the Indianapolis Colts at Buffalo Bills

Places
 Arizona Snowbowl, a ski area near Flagstaff, Arizona
 Camden Snow Bowl, a ski area in Camden, Maine
 Middlebury College Snow Bowl, a ski area in Hancock, Vermont
 Montana Snowbowl, a ski area near Missoula, Montana

See also
 Ice Bowl (disambiguation)
 Freezer Bowl